Ryan Christopherson (born July 26, 1972) is a former running back in the National Football League for the Jacksonville Jaguars and Arizona Cardinals. He played college football at Wyoming and was drafted in the fifth round of the 1995 NFL Draft.

College career
Christopherson finished his Wyoming career as the school’s all-time rushing leader with 2,906 yards. He also is the single-season rushing leader with 1,455 yards, which he gained as a senior in 1994. He was elected to the school's athletic Hall of Fame in 2006.

Professional career
In the 1995 NFL Draft, the Jacksonville Jaguars picked Christopherson in the fifth round as the 169th overall pick.

References

1972 births
Living people
American football running backs
Jacksonville Jaguars players
Arizona Cardinals players
Wyoming Cowboys football players
Sportspeople from Sioux Falls, South Dakota
Players of American football from South Dakota